The Chabbie River is a tributary of the Turgeon River flowing through Canada, in:
 Cochrane District, Northeastern Ontario;
 Eeyou Istchee Baie-James (municipality), in Jamésie, in the administrative region of Nord-du-Québec in Québec.

Forestry is the main economic activity of the sector; recreational tourism activities, second.

The surface of the river is usually frozen from early November to mid-May, but safe circulation on the ice generally occurs from mid-November to the end of April.

Geography 
The main hydrographic slopes adjacent to the Chabbie River are:
 North side: Turcotte River, Little Turcotte River;
 East Side: Turcotte River, Turgeon River;
 South side: Burntbush River, Kabika River (Ontario), Patten River;
 West side: Burntbush River, Burntbush River, Tweed North River.

The Chabbie River originates at the mouth of a forest brook feeding on a small marsh area in the eastern part of the Cochrane District , in Ontario.

The mouth of the small head lake is located at:
 west of the boundary between Ontario and Quebec;
 northwest of the mouth of the Chabbie River (confluence with the Turgeon River);
 southwest of the mouth of the Turgeon River (in Quebec);
 southeast of a southern bay of Kesagami Lake in Ontario.

From the mouth of the small head lake, the Chabbie River runs on  according to the following segments:
) to south-east, then south-westerly, to the mouth of the "North Chabbie Lake" which flows through {convert|0.7|km} to the South-East;
 to the south-east including through a small unidentified lake and the northern part of Lake Chabbie to the northeast to its mouth;
 southeasterly to the north boundary of Noseworthy Township;
southeasterly to the west boundary of Bradette Township;
 to the southeast in Bradette Township, then eastward to the boundary between Ontario and Quebec;
eastward in the Township of Dieppe in Quebec to the mouth.

The Chabbie River flows on the west bank of the Turgeon River. This confluence is located at:
 east of the boundary between Quebec and Ontario;
 southwest of the mouth of the Turgeon River (confluence with the Harricana River);
 southeast of a southern bay of Kesagami Lake in Ontario.

Toponymy 
The term "Turcotte" is a surname of family of French origine.

See also 
Northeastern Ontario
Turcotte River, a watercourse
Turgeon River, a watercourse
Harricana River, a watercourse
James Bay, a body of water

References 

Rivers of Cochrane District
Rivers of Nord-du-Québec